Phi Pi Phi was a social fraternity founded at Northwestern University in 1915. It merged with Alpha Sigma Phi in 1939.

History

In 1923, it became an undergraduate college fraternity and grew to twenty-one chapters by 1930, however only seven were active. Discussions took place between Phi Pi Phi and Alpha Sigma Phi during 1937 and into 1938. The merger that took place in 1939 had five chapters join Alpha Sigma Phi: Case Institute of Technology, Baldwin Wallace College, Westminster College, Illinois Institute of Technology, and Purdue University. The chapter at University of Mississippi was originally planned to be part of the merger, but failed before initiation. Special initiations of Phi Pi Phi alumni took place from the time of the merger until 1944.

It joined the National Interfraternity Conference as a Junior member during early November 1924.

Symbols and traditions
The magazine of the Fraternity was called The Quarterly of Phi Pi Phi, and was established in 1924.  Copies are available online on the Alpha Sigma Phi website.

Colors of the Fraternity were Turquoise Blue and Black.  The flower was the Bluebell.

Chapters
The chapters of Phi Pi Phi were:
Alpha Omega - Founders
Alpha - Northwestern University - Evanston, Illinois
Beta - University of Chicago - Chicago, Illinois
Gamma - Armour Institute of Technology Chicago, Illinois
Delta - University of Illinois Champaign, Illinois
Epsilon - Washburn College Topeka, Kansas
Zeta - University of Wisconsin Madison, Wisconsin
Eta - University of Utah Salt Lake City, Utah 
Theta - University of California Berkeley, California 
Iota - Washington & Jefferson College Washington, Pennsylvania -
Lambda - Case School of Applied Science Cleveland, Ohio 
Mu - Baldwin-Wallace College Berea, Ohio 
Nu - Westminster College New Wilmington, Pennsylvania
Xi - North Carolina State College Raleigh, North Carolina
Omicron - University of Mississippi University, Miss. 
Pi  - University of South Carolina Columbia, South Carolina
Rho - St. Lawrence University Canton, New York
Sigma - Pennsylvania State College State College, Pennsylvania
Tau - University of Tennessee Knoxville, Tennessee
Upsilon - Oregon State College Corvallis, Oregon

References

External links
 Phi Pi Phi Quarterly

Defunct former members of the North American Interfraternity Conference
Student organizations established in 1915
1915 establishments in Illinois
Alpha Sigma Phi